The Cloquet City Hall, also known as the Spafford Building, is located at Avenue B and Arch Street in Cloquet in the U.S. state of Minnesota.  The red brick Colonial Revival building was built in 1920 and features quoinblocks, keystones, and an entablature with a high parapet. Tall stone pilasters extend to the high cornice.

References

Buildings and structures in Carlton County, Minnesota
City and town halls on the National Register of Historic Places in Minnesota
National Register of Historic Places in Carlton County, Minnesota
Government buildings completed in 1920
1920 establishments in Minnesota
Colonial Revival architecture in Minnesota
Cloquet, Minnesota